S. maximus  may refer to:
 Saltator maximus, the buff-throated saltator, a seed-eating bird species that breeds from southeastern Mexico to western Ecuador and northeastern Brazil
 Saurophaganax maximus, an allosaurid dinosaur species from the Morrison Formation of Jurassic North America

See also
 Maximus (disambiguation)